Vijay Sundar Prashanth (born 27 October 1986) is a professional Indian tennis player. He caught everyone eye, when he won against Indian Davis Cup player Yuki Bhambri at 2015 Aircel Chennai Open. Prashanth has a career high ATP singles ranking of 335 achieved on 5 October 2015. He also has a career high ATP doubles ranking of 193 achieved on 2 August 2018. Prashanth has won Individual Doubles GOLD for India at the INDOOR ASIAN GAMES held in Ashgabat, Turkmenistan in September 2017. He also won Individual Singles SILVER for India at the INDOOR ASIAN GAMES held in Ashgabat, Turkmenistan in September 2017.

Prashanth won the men's doubles gold medal at the 2016 South Asian Games, partnering Ramkumar Ramanathan.

Professional results

2015: National Games in Trivandrum, Kerala; First ATP tournament 
Medalist at the 35th National Games held in Trivandrum, Kerala in 2015 [TEAM- Gold medal; INDIVIDUAL DOUBLES- Silver medal]

After successful wins in qualifiers, Prasanth entered into 2015 Aircel Chennai Open ATP world tour main draw and debuted against Jiří Veselý, he lost to him with 6–2 , 6–1.

2016: South Asian Games in Guwahati, India

Prashanth won the men's doubles gold medal at the 2016 South Asian Games, partnering Ramkumar Ramanathan.

2017: Indoor Asian Games in Ashgabat, Turkmenistan

Prashanth won Individual Mens Doubles Gold and Individual Mens Singles Silver for India at the Indoor Asian Games held in Ashgabat, Turkmenistan in September 2017.

ATP Challenger and ITF Futures/World Tennis Tour finals

Singles: 10 (4–6)

Doubles: 56 (23–33)

References

External links
 
 

1986 births
Tamil sportspeople
Living people
Indian male tennis players
Racket sportspeople from Chennai
South Asian Games gold medalists for India
South Asian Games medalists in tennis